Combat School is a Canadian documentary television series that premiered on March 10, 2009, on the Discovery Channel. The show focuses on a platoon of soldiers as they undergo warfare training prior to disembarking for a tour of duty in Afghanistan. The series was produced by Paperny Entertainment. The series was narrated by Canadian actor Kavan Smith.

Synopsis
Combat School documents the combat training and eventual deployment of infantry soldiers from 1 Platoon, Mike Company, 3rd Battalion, The Royal Canadian Regiment. The platoon of 40 men and women are followed through several months of training at CFB Petawawa, Ontario, CFB Wainwright, Alberta, and Fort Bliss, Texas. In the final episode, the soldiers are followed through their first two weeks in Afghanistan.

Episodes

Soldiers featured

Captain Jon Cox
Major Cayle Oberwarth
Lieutenant Colonel Roger Barrett
Warrant Officer Bruce Rhodenizer
Sergeant Mike Dwyer
Sergeant Jamie Lewis

Corporal Salvatore "Sam" Miranda
Corporal Evynne Sop
Corporal Derek Pannozzo
Corporal Douglas Chick
Corporal Katie Hodges
Private Jeff Valentiate
Private Dan Martin

DVD release
Combat School was released on DVD on October 13, 2009.  The DVD set includes all six episodes of the series, plus over forty-five minutes of bonus footage.

References

External links

Production website

2009 Canadian television series debuts
2009 Canadian television series endings
2000s Canadian reality television series
Discovery Channel (Canada) original programming
Television series by Entertainment One